Yukhnov is a town and the administrative center of Yukhnovsky District in Kaluga Oblast, Russia, located on the Kunava River (Oka's basin)  northwest of Kaluga, the administrative center of the oblast. Population:

History
It has been known since 1410. The "Town" status was granted to it in the year 1777.During the Second World War the town was occupied by the Germans from October 5, 1941 to March 5, 1942.

Administrative and municipal status
Within the framework of administrative divisions, Yukhnov serves as the administrative center of Yukhnovsky District, to which it is directly subordinated. As a municipal division, the town of Yukhnov is incorporated within Yukhnovsky Municipal District as Yukhnov Urban Settlement.

References

Notes

Sources

Cities and towns in Kaluga Oblast
Yukhnovsky Uyezd